Warren Cowgill (December 19, 1929 – June 20, 1985) was an American linguist. He was a professor of linguistics at Yale University and the Encyclopædia Britannica's authority on Indo-European linguistics. Cowgill was unusual among Indo-European linguists of his time in believing that Indo-European should be classified as a branch of Indo-Hittite, with Hittite as a sister language of the Indo-European languages, rather than a daughter language.

Warren Cowgill and his twin brother, anthropologist George Cowgill, were born near Grangeville, Idaho. Along with his brother, he graduated from Stanford University in 1952 and received a Ph.D. from Yale in 1957. He was a member of the Yale faculty in the Department of Linguistics until his death in 1985.

Notes

External links
Table of contents for The Collected Writings of Warren Cowgill

1929 births
1985 deaths
20th-century linguists
Historical linguists
Indo-Europeanists
Linguists from the United States
Linguists of Indo-European languages
Paleolinguists
Stanford University alumni
Yale Graduate School of Arts and Sciences alumni
Yale University faculty